List of airports in Dominica, sorted by location.



List

See also 

 Transport in Dominica
 List of airports by ICAO code: T#TD - Dominica

External links 
Lists of airports in Dominica:
Great Circle Mapper
Aircraft Charter World
The Airport Guide
World Aero Data
A-Z World Airports
FallingRain.com

 
Dominica
Airports
Airports
Dominica